Čakovice (German Tschakowitz) is a municipal district (městská část) in Prague. It is located in the north-eastern part of the city. As of 2008, there were 8,644 inhabitants living in Čakovice. The municipal district consists of three cadastral areas (katastrální území): Čakovice, Miškovice and Třeboradice.

The Čakovice cadastre has an area of 3.83 km2 and a population of 6,417 inhabitants.

The first written record of Čakovice is from the 11th century. The town became part of Prague in 1968.

External links 
 Praha-Čakovice - Official homepage

Districts of Prague